The 1992–93 Meistriliiga season was the third season of the Meistriliiga, the top level of ice hockey in Estonia. Eight teams participated in the league, and Kreenholm Narva won the championship.

Final round

5th place

6th place game 
 HK Jõgeva – Tiigrid Tallinn 3:1

External links
Season on hockeyarchives.info

Meistriliiga
Meist
Meistriliiga (ice hockey) seasons